This article is about the Farr 52 racing sailboat Zamazaan.For the racehorse of the same name, see Zamazaan (horse).

 52 foot racing sloop of timber (wood) construction
 Designed in 1977 by noted yacht designer Bruce Farr

Racing Record 
 1980: Winner of St Francis Yacht Club
 Big Boat Series IOR I
 City of San Francisco Trophy
Skippered by owner Neville H Price
 1982: Winner of Pacific Cup IOR division

External links
 Zamazaan Yacht Racing
 Pacific Cup 2000
Neville H. Price

Individual sailing vessels